Duidania is a monotypic genus of flowering plants in the family Rubiaceae. The genus contains only one species, viz. Duidania montana, which is found in Guyana and southern Venezuela.

This plant is a shrub or small tree with leathery leaves and clusters of tubular yellow flowers. It grows on the tepuis of the Guiana Highlands in wet scrub and cloud forest habitat.

References

Monotypic Rubiaceae genera
Flora of Guyana
Flora of Venezuela
Flora of the Tepuis